Coelocaryon is a genus of flowering plants in the family Myristicaceae. It is native to tropical Africa.

Species
According to Kew's Plants of the World Online, there are four accepted species:

Coelocaryon botryoides Vermoesen
Coelocaryon oxycarpum Stapf
Coelocaryon preussii Warb.
Coelocaryon sphaerocarpum Fouilloy

References

Myristicaceae genera